Velike Loče is a small village above Markovščina in the Municipality of Hrpelje-Kozina in the Littoral region of Slovenia.

References

External links

Velike Loče on Geopedia

Populated places in the Municipality of Hrpelje-Kozina